Calamus inermis (synonym C. wailong) is a species of flowering plant in the family Arecaceae . It is found native to the Yunnan region of China and Indochina.
Its natural habitat is subtropical or tropical seasonal forests. It is threatened by habitat loss.

References

inermis
Flora of Indo-China
Flora of Yunnan
Critically endangered plants
Taxonomy articles created by Polbot
Taxobox binomials not recognized by IUCN